Girls at Sea is a 1977 Danish comedy film directed by Finn Henriksen and starring Helle Merete Sørensen.

Cast
 Helle Merete Sørensen as Constable Vibeke 'Vibsen' Margrethe Nielsen
 Ulla Jessen as Constable Magda Gammelgaard
 Marianne Tønsberg as Constable Irmgard Mathisen
 Karl Stegger as Ship Commander
 Henning Jensen as Deputy Commander Juhl
 Finn Nielsen as Lieutenant Harry Hansen
 Ole Søltoft as Sailor Pamper
 Søren Strømberg as Sailor Otto Harboe
 Lille Palle as Sailor Palle
 Torben Jensen as Sailor Panama
 Lars Høy as Sailor Fritz
 Torben Jetsmark as Sailor Vaskebjørn
 Dirch Passer as Senior Sergeant Vasby
 Pierre Miehe-Renard as Mass Gast
 Cæsar as Sparks
 Claus Nissen as Banjemester
 Per Pallesen as Sergeant 'Mugge' Martinsen
 Allan Larsen as Sailor
 Jan Hovgaard as Sailor (as Jan Hougaard)
 Jens Brenaa as Sailor
 Kjeld Nørgaard as Lieutenant Captain
 Arthur Jensen as Investigator

External links
 

1977 films
1970s Danish-language films
1977 comedy films
Films directed by Finn Henriksen
Danish comedy films